Wolfgang Fuchs may refer to:

Wolfgang Heinrich Johannes Fuchs (1915–1997), German mathematician
Wolfgang J. Fuchs (1945–2020), German author